Ranpokunagama M. V. was founded in 1988. It is considered to be the leading Public School in Ranpokunagama. It is a Government School, meaning that it is controlled by the government as opposed to the Provincial Council and provides only the secondary education. RMV is a secondary school as well as the foremost college in Sri Lanka.

History 

This land was taken to the government under the land registration act in 1972 earlier it was called "Pokunawala Waththa".
Because the legend says that it had many ponds in those days.
After that under the project of "Gamudawa" moment it was renamed as "Ranpokunagama".
To facilitate good education to the residents of Ranpokunagama the school had been 
established by the president Ransinghe Premadasa on 11 January 1988.
The first Principal was Mrs. R.M.P.Greta Rajapaksha in 1988.

Principals List

Houses 

The students are divided into 3 Houses:

Mayura  House
Paravi  House
Thisara House

References

External links and sources 

Official
 

National schools in Sri Lanka
Boarding schools in Sri Lanka
Schools in Gampaha District